Saphenista is a genus of moths belonging to the family Tortricidae.

Species
Saphenista absidata Razowski, 1994
Saphenista aculeata (Razowski, 1967)
Saphenista aeraria (Razowski, 1967)
Saphenista allasia Razowski, 1994
Saphenista alpha Razowski & Becker, 2007
Saphenista ambidextria Razowski, 1994
Saphenista amusa Razowski, 1993
Saphenista anaxia (Clarke, 1968)
Saphenista beta Razowski & Becker, 2007
Saphenista bimaculata Nishida & Adamski, 2004
Saphenista brunneomaculata Razowski & Wojtusiak, 2008
Saphenista burrens Razowski, 1993
Saphenista campalita Razowski, 1993
Saphenista carchiana Razowski & Becker, 2002
Saphenista ceteora Razowski & Becker, 2002
Saphenista chanostium Razowski & Wojtusiak, 2009
Saphenista chiriboga Razowski & Wojtusiak, 2008
Saphenista chloromixta Razowski, 1992
Saphenista chorfascia Razowski & Becker, 2007
Saphenista cinigmula (Razowski & Becker, 1986)
Saphenista cnemiodota Razowski, 1994
Saphenista consectaria Razowski, 1993
Saphenista consona Razowski & Becker, 1983
Saphenista constipata Razowski, 1994
Saphenista consulta Razowski, 1986
Saphenista contermina Razowski & Becker, 2002
Saphenista cordifera (Meyrick, 1932)
Saphenista cryptogramma Razowski & Becker, 1994
Saphenista cubana Razowski & Becker, 2007
Saphenista cuscana Razowski & Wojtusiak, 2010
Saphenista cyphoma Razowski, 1994
Saphenista delapsa Razowski, 1990
Saphenista delicatulana (Zeller, 1877)
Saphenista deliphrobursa (Razowski, 1992)
Saphenista dexia Razowski & Becker, 1986
Saphenista discrepans Razowski, 1994
Saphenista domna (Clarke, 1968)
Saphenista embolina Razowski, 1984
Saphenista endomycha Razowski, 1992
Saphenista eneilema Razowski, 1992
Saphenista ephimera Razowski, 1992
Saphenista epiera Razowski, 1992
Saphenista epipolea Razowski, 1992
Saphenista eranna Razowski & Becker, 1986
Saphenista erasmia Razowski, 1992
Saphenista ereba Razowski, 1992
Saphenista euprepia Razowski, 1993
Saphenista fluida Razowski, 1986
Saphenista frangula (Clarke, 1968)
Saphenista gilva Razowski & Becker, 1986
Saphenista glorianda Razowski, 1986
Saphenista gnathmocera Razowski, 1992
Saphenista illimis Razowski, 1986
Saphenista imaginaria Razowski & Becker, 1986
Saphenista incauta Razowski & Becker, 1986
Saphenista juvenca Razowski & Becker, 1986
Saphenista lacteipalpis (Walsingham, 1891)
Saphenista lassa (Razowski, 1986)
Saphenista lathridia Razowski & Becker, 1986
Saphenista leuconigra Razowski & Wojtusiak, 2008
Saphenista lineata Razowski & Becker, 2002
Saphenista livida Razowski, 1986
Saphenista mediocris Razowski, 1986
Saphenista melema Razowski, 1992
Saphenista merana Razowski & Becker, 2002
Saphenista milicha Razowski, 1994
Saphenista mira Razowski, 1989
Saphenista muerta Nishida & Adamski, 2004
Saphenista multistrigata Walsingham, 1914
Saphenista nauphraga Razowski & Becker, 1983
Saphenista nephelodes (Clarke, 1968)
Saphenista nomonana (Kearfott, 1907)
Saphenista nongrata Razowski, 1986
Saphenista novaelimae Razowski & Becker, 2007
Saphenista nuda Razowski & Becker, 1999
Saphenista ochraurea Razowski & Becker, 2002
Saphenista omoea Razowski, 1993
Saphenista onychina Razowski & Becker, 1986
Saphenista oreada Razowski & Becker, 1986
Saphenista orescia Razowski & Becker, 1986
Saphenista orichalcana Razowski & Becker, 1986
Saphenista paraconsona Razowski & Becker, 2002
Saphenista pascana Razowski & Wojtusiak, 2010
Saphenista parvimaculana (Walsingham, 1879)
Saphenista penai (Clarke, 1968)
Saphenista peraviae Razowski, 1994
Saphenista peruviana Razowski, 1993
Saphenista phenax Razowski, 1994
Saphenista praefasciata (Meyrick, 1932)
Saphenista praia Razowski, 1986
Saphenista pruinosana (Zeller, 1877)
Saphenista pululahuana Razowski & Wojtusiak, 2008
Saphenista pyrczi Razowski & Wojtusiak, 2009
Saphenista rafaeliana Razowski, 1989
Saphenista rawlinsiana Razowski, 1994
Saphenista rhabducha Razowski & Becker, 2007
Saphenista rivadeneirai Razowski & Pelz, 2001
Saphenista rosariana Razowski & Becker, 2007
Saphenista rufoscripta Razowski & Wojtusiak, 2010
Saphenista rufozodion Razowski & Becker, 2002
Saphenista runtuna Razowski & Wojtusiak, 2009
Saphenista ryrsiloba Razowski, 1990
Saphenista saragurae Razowski & Wojtusiak, 2008
Saphenista saxicolana (Walsingham, 1879)
Saphenista scalena Razowski & Becker, 2007
Saphenista sclerorhaphia Razowski & Becker, 1994
Saphenista semistrigata Forbes, 1931
Saphenista simillima Razowski & Becker, 2007
Saphenista solda Razowski, 1994
Saphenista solisae Razowski & Becker, 2007
Saphenista sphragidias (Meyrick, 1932)
Saphenista splendida Razowski & Becker, 2002
Saphenista storthingoloba Razowski, 1992
Saphenista subsphragidias Razowski & Becker, 2002
Saphenista substructa (Meyrick, 1927)
Saphenista temperata Razowski, 1986
Saphenista teopiscana Razowski & Becker, 1986
Saphenista tufinoa Razowski, 1999
Saphenista turguinoa Razowski & Becker, 2007
Saphenista xysta Razowski, 1994

See also
List of Tortricidae genera

References

 , 1914, Biol. Centr.-Am. Lepid. Heterocera 4: 296
 , 2005: World Catalogue of Insects volume 5 Tortricidae.
 , 2011: Diagnoses and remarks on genera of Tortricidae, 2: Cochylini (Lepidoptera: Tortricidae). SHILAP Revista de Lepidopterología 39 (156): 397–414.
 , 2002: Systematic and faunistic data on Neotropical Cochylini (Lepidoptera: Tortricidae), with descriptions of new species. Part.1. Acta zool. cracov. 45: 287-316 
 , 2008: Tortricidae from the mountains of Ecuador. Part III. Western Cordillera (Insecta: Lepidoptera). Genus 19 (3): 497–575. Full article: 
 , 2009: Tortricidae (Lepidoptera) from the mountains of Ecuador and remarks on their geographical distribution. Part IV. Eastern Cordillera. Acta Zoologica Cracoviensia 51B (1-2): 119–187. doi:10.3409/azc.52b_1-2.119-187. Full article: .
 , 2010: Tortricidae (Lepidoptera) from Peru. Acta Zoologica Cracoviensia 53B (1-2): 73-159. . Full article: .

External links
Tortricid.net

 
Cochylini
Tortricidae genera